Akeem Joseph (born June 13, 1991), better known by his stage name AK the Savior (stylized as AKTHESAVIOR), is an American rapper from Brooklyn, New York.  He is one half of the hip hop duo The Underachievers, along with his childhood friend Issa Gold, with whom he formed the group in 2011. AK, along with his duo partner Issa, is also part of the New York-based supergroups Clockwork Indigo (with Flatbush Zombies) and Beast Coast (with Flatbush Zombies and Pro Era). He is also of trinidadian descent.

Discography

Mixtapes (solo) 
 Blessings in the Gray (2014)
 Blessings in the Gray 2 (2016)
 Second 2 None (2018)
 Almost Home (2020)
 Hiatus (2021)
 Second 2 None 2 (2022)

Studio albums (with The Underachievers) 

lord unknown

EPs (with The Underachievers)

Mixtapes (with The Underachievers)

References

1991 births
Living people
Rappers from Brooklyn
People from Flatbush, Brooklyn
Record producers from New York (state)
21st-century American rappers
Beast Coast members